Omm ol Ejaj (also Romanized as Omm ol ‘Ejāj) is a village in Jazireh-ye Minu Rural District, Minu District, Khorramshahr County, Khuzestan Province, Iran. At the 2006 census, its population was 264, in 56 families.

References 

Populated places in Khorramshahr County